Crime in Hong Kong is generally low but is still present in various forms. The most common crimes are thefts, assaults, vandalism, burglaries, drug offenses, sex trafficking, and triad-related crimes. In 2015, Hong Kong had one of the lowest murder rates in the world, comparable to Japan but higher than Macao or Singapore.

Statistics

In the year 2015, crime dropped to a 36-year low for Hong Kong.  There were 10,889 reported incidents of violent crimes in Hong Kong. Hong Kong had 22 homicides, 5,360 incidents of wounding and serious assaults, 223 robberies, 2,579 burglaries, and 70 rapes. In the 2000s, the number and rate of murders were the highest in 2002. 2011 had the lowest rate and number of murders, at 17 (0.2 murders per 100,000 people; lowest in the world). The homicide rate increased 129.6% in 2013 from 2012 though this was due to the inclusion of 39 deaths from the Lamma Island ferry collision.

The most common forms of crime in Hong Kong are non-violent crimes. There were 27,512 reports of theft in Hong Kong in 2015. The most common forms of theft were miscellaneous thefts, shoplifting, pick-pocketing, and vehicle theft. Criminal damage is also a common crime in Hong Kong, with 5,920 reports in 2015.

Organised crime

Crimes committed by triads occur in Hong Kong. Common triad-related offenses include extortion, illegal gambling, drug trafficking, and racketeering. One of the world's largest triads, Sun Yee On, was founded in Hong Kong in 1919 and is reported to have 55,000 members worldwide. Sun Yee On's rival organisation, 14K Triad, was formed in Guangzhou, Guangdong, China in 1945, and relocated to Hong Kong in 1949. According to British criminal Colin Blaney in his autobiography Undesirables, British organised crime groups known as the Wide Awake Firm and the Inter City Jibbers that specialise in jewelry thefts and picking pockets have also been known to operate in Hong Kong.

Domestic and transnational criminal organizations carry out sex trafficking in China, including Hong Kong. Many mainland Chinese prostitutes in Hong Kong are reportedly sexually trafficked victims.

Sex trafficking

Sex trafficking in Hong Kong is an issue. Hongkonger and foreign women and girls are forced into prostitution in brothels, homes, and businesses in the city. There is no comprehensive anti-human trafficking law in Hong Kong.

Racism
There have been reports of systematic racism in Hong Kong against non-Chinese or "dark-skinned" citizens.

See also
Crime in China
Human trafficking in Hong Kong
Police in Hong Kong
List of countries by intentional homicide rate.

References